Maisin may be:
Maisin people
Maisin language